Seán Canney (born 6 April 1960) is an Irish Independent politician who has been a Teachta Dála (TD) for the Galway East constituency since 2016. He served as a Minister of State from 2016 to 2017 and again from 2018 to 2020.

A native of Belclare, Tuam, County Galway. Canney was campaign manager for his brother-in-law, Paddy McHugh, in the 2002 general election, in which McHugh gained a seat in the Galway East constituency.

As an Independent candidate, Canney was elected to Galway County Council in 2004, on his first attempt. He was re-elected in each of the subsequent local elections in 2009 and 2014. In both the 2009 and 2014 elections, he topped the poll in the Tuam local electoral area.

He was an unsuccessful candidate in the 2011 general election in the Galway East constituency, receiving 5,567 first preference votes.

He served as Mayor of County Galway for the term 2007 to 2008, and served on a number of boards and committees. He joined the Independent Alliance in advance of the 2016 general election. At the 2016 general election, he topped the poll in Galway East, securing 8,447 first preference votes. After lengthy government formation talks, the Independent Alliance supported the nomination of Enda Kenny as Taoiseach on 6 May 2016, allowing Kenny to become the first leader of Fine Gael to be re-appointed to this office.

He was appointed a member of the Committee on Housing and Homelessness, a position he held until his appointment on 19 May 2016 by the new government as Minister of State at the Department of Public Expenditure and Reform with special responsibility for the Office of Public Works and Flood Relief. He served in that position until 3 June 2017, when he was succeeded by Kevin "Boxer" Moran, part of an arrangement within the Independent Alliance.

He has advocated the reopening the Western Rail Corridor to trains from Galway to Claremorris.

He left the Independent Alliance in May 2018, but continued to support the government.

In a reshuffle after the resignation of Denis Naughten from cabinet, Canney returned to the ministerial ranks on 16 October 2018. On 13 October 2018, he was appointed by the government on nomination by Leo Varadkar as Minister of State at the Department of Rural and Community Development and at the Department of Communications, Climate Action and Environment with special responsibility for natural resources, community affairs and digital development.

Canney was re-elected at the February 2020 general election. He stayed in ministerial office until the formation of a new government on 27 June 2020. He sits in the Regional Group in the 33rd Dáil.

References

External links

Living people
Independent TDs
Local councillors in County Galway
Mayors of places in the Republic of Ireland
Members of the 32nd Dáil
Ministers of State of the 32nd Dáil
People from Tuam
Politicians from County Galway
1960 births
Alumni of the Institute of Technology, Sligo
Members of the 33rd Dáil